Pebbles, Volume 7 is a compilation album in the Pebbles series. The music on this album has no relation to Pebbles, Volume 7 that was released on CD many years later.

Release data

This album was released as an LP by BFD Records in 1980 (as #BFD-5024) and was kept in print for many years by AIP Records.

Notes on the tracks

The Human Beings are not to be confused with the Human Beinz, which make an appearance on Pebbles, Volume 8.  A song by The Chocolate Watchband was included on the original Nuggets compilation, and the Dovers are also represented on Pebbles, Volume 2. The Craig are an English group.

Track listing

Side 1:

 Something Wild: "Trippin' Out", 2:05
 The Descendants: "Lela", 2:30
 The Denims: "White Ship", 2:42
 The Heard: "Stop It Baby", 2:23
 Hysterics: "Everything's There", 2:15
 Silver Fleet: "Look out World", 2:41
 The Human Beings: "You're Bad News", 2:11
 The Chocolate Watchband: "Sweet Young Thing", 2:41
 The Craig: "I Must Be Mad", 2:52

Side 2:

 The Edge: "Seen through the Eyes", 2:58
 We the People: "When I Arrive", 3:01
 The Survivors: "Shakin' with Linda", 2:48
 Four Fifths: "If You Still Want Me", 2:00
 The Dovers: "She's Not Just Anybody", 1:54
 Sunday Funnies: "A Pindaric Ode", 2:12
 The Painted Ship: "Frustration", 2:53
 The Live Wires: "Love", 3:20

Pebbles (series) albums
1980 compilation albums